Dave MacLeod (born 17 July 1978) is a Scottish rock climber, ice climber, and climbing author.  MacLeod is best known for being the first climber in the world to climb in free solo style (without rope) a  route (Darwin Dixit in Margalef, in 2008), and for climbing one of the hardest traditional climbing routes in the world (Rhapsody on  Dumbarton Rock, graded E11 7a, in 2006).

Climbing career

Rock climbing
In April 2006, MacLeod established the climb Rhapsody on  Dumbarton Rock which, at a grade of E11 7a, was possibly the hardest trad climbing route in the world.  Rhapsody is the true finish to the line of Requiem, graded E8 6b. Requiem was climbed in 1983 by Dave Cuthbertson and was one of the hardest rock climbs in the world at the time. It follows a crack-line that fades out to a seam at half height. Requiem follows a flake heading rightwards to finish, while Rhapsody climbs the line of the crack all the way to the top. The top half of the crack gives 8c+ climbing and takes no more protection. MacLeod took many long falls from this runout, three from the last move in which he fell 70 feet and injured himself by hitting the rock at the end of the fall. In 2008 Steve McClure made the third ascent of Rhapsody and confirmed the grade. The ascent of Rhapsody is the subject of the movie E11 (2006) directed by Paul Diffley and produced by Hot Aches Productions. MacLeod has since featured in several more climbing films by Hot Aches Productions.

In 2008, MacLeod became the first climber in history to free solo a route graded  (Darwin Dixit in Margalef).

In 2008, MacLeod completed the traditional rock climb, Echo Wall, an extreme and as-yet ungraded rock climb on Ben Nevis, which took two years of preparation. MacLeod described Echo Wall as harder than Rhapsody but left the route ungraded in a possible attempt to avoid the earlier controversy surrounding the E11 grade.

On 28 August 2010, MacLeod and Tim Emmett established the route The Usual Suspects on Sron Uladail on Harris, provisionally graded E9 7a, in an ascent broadcast live on BBC Two Scotland. As part of their preparation, MacLeod and Emmett successfully established five new routes on five Hebridean islands (counting Lewis with Harris as two separate islands) in five days, an achievement documented in the BBC Scotland series 5 Climbs, 5 Islands (later released on DVD as Triple 5). MacLeod has continued his association with BBC Scotland, filming The First Great Climb (broadcast on 22 November 2011), in which he replicated a successful 1876 attempt on the Stack of Handa using the type of equipment that would have been available at the time, and Climbing – No Limits! (broadcast on 12 April 2012), establishing new routes in the Yorkshire Dales and the Peak District.

Mixed climbing

MacLeod has also established hard routes in mixed climbing with ice axes and crampons, climbing Good Training for Something with Canadian climber Will Gadd at a grade of M12. In 2005, he established the hardest traditional mixed climbing route in the world at the time, The Hurting in Coire an t-Sneachda, Cairngorms. The route has been repeated a few times and has a Scottish winter grade of XI,11 (M9+/M10) with hard, technical climbing over very poor protection.

Writing

In December 2009, Macleod's book 9 Out of 10 Climbers Make the Same Mistakes: Navigation Through the Maze of Advice for the Self-coached Climber was published. In 2015, Macleod's book Make or Break: Don't Let Climbing Injuries Dictate Your Success was published.

Bibliography

See also 
History of rock climbing
List of first ascents (sport climbing)
Johnny Dawes, British traditional climber
Sonnie Trotter, Canadian traditional climber

References

External links
 Dave MacLeod MacLeod's official website
 Blog MacLeod's official blog
 Online Climbing Coach Blog MacLeod's coaching blog
 E11 – the movie
 Profile on climbing.com
 Profile on blackdiamondequipment.com

1978 births
Living people
Sportspeople from Dumbarton
Scottish rock climbers
Scottish mountain climbers
Free soloists
Ice climbers